Gallone is an Italian surname. Notable people with the surname include:

 Carmine Gallone (1885–1973), Italian film director
 Gianfranco Gallone (born 1963), Italian bishop and Vatican diplomat
 Luca Gallone (born 1996), British magician
 Maria Alessandra Gallone (born 1966), Italian politician
 Soava Gallone (1880–1957), Polish-born Italian actress, wife of Carmine

See also
 Galloni, surname
 Specchia Gallone, town in Italy

Italian-language surnames
Surnames of Italian origin